LRT televizija, formerly known as LTV 1, is the flagship television channel of  Lithuanian National Radio and Television (Lithuanian: Lietuvos nacionalinis radijas ir televizija).

History
LRT televizija was launched on 30 April 1957 as LTV (Lietuvos Televizija), and began broadcasting in colour in 1975 using SECAM colour. The channel was rebranded on 27 July 2012 to LRT televizija. Broadcasting in 16:9 format began on 25 March 2013. A HD version of the channel was launched on 20 January 2014.

LRT televizija broadcasts an average of 18 hours per day (as of 2014, it is 24 hours per day) and is visible throughout Lithuania, via streaming and via the satellite Sirius 4 and Eastern Europe (one of the Viasat package of encrypted channels). LRT televizija can be watched free on the internet. However, due to copyright restrictions, only Lithuania is watched through ISP.

Programming
Programming consists of:

Information/News – 15%
Socio-public and Education – 11%
TV Magazines and Journalistic Research – 9.4%
Culture – 8%
Sport – 3.6%
Programmes for Children – 7.4%
Entertainment – 0.3%
Music – 29.8%
Religious programmes – 0.5%
Programmes for ethnic minorities – 1%  
Feature films and series – 14%

Logos and identities

References

External links

Television channels in Lithuania
Television channels and stations established in 1957
1957 establishments in Lithuania